Illinois Route 70 is a state road in far north-central Illinois. It runs from West Howard Street/Oak Street in Durand to Business U.S. Route 20 in Rockford.

Route description 
Illinois 70 is the main route northwest of Rockford, and is called Kilburn Avenue and Trask Bridge Road in this area. The route serves mainly rural areas and consists of two-lane undivided surface street for its entire length.

History 
SBI Route 70 ran from Durand to Rockford to Mendota, located about 60 miles (97 km) south of Rockford. In 1940, U.S. Route 51 replaced Illinois 70 from Mendota to Rockford, and Illinois 70 was pulled back to its current intersection with what was then U.S. 20.

Major intersections

References 

070
U.S. Route 51
Transportation in Winnebago County, Illinois
Transportation in Rockford, Illinois